Theodore Lawrence James (August 8, 1906 – June 8, 1999) was an American football player and coach.

Playing career
In college, James starred for the University of Nebraska–Lincoln Cornhuskers from 1926 to 1928 and was inducted into the Nebraska Football Hall of Fame. After graduating, he played for the Frankford Yellow Jackets in the National Football League (NFL), appearing in 10 games in 1929.

Coaching career
After playing for one year in the NFL, he became the head football coach at the University of Nebraska at Kearney from 1930 to 1932. He accumulated a record of 13–10–2 and won the Nebraska Intercollegiate Athletic Association title in 1930.

During that time, he was also the head men's basketball coach for three seasons, compiling a 33–27 record.

Head coaching record

Football

References

External links
 
 Nebraska–Kearney Hall of Fame bio

1906 births
1999 deaths
American football centers
American football guards
Basketball coaches from Colorado
Frankford Yellow Jackets players
Nebraska Cornhuskers football players
Nebraska–Kearney Lopers football coaches
Nebraska–Kearney Lopers men's basketball coaches
People from Gage County, Nebraska
People from Greeley, Colorado
Players of American football from Colorado